Marco Stefano Belinelli (born 25 March 1986) is an Italian professional basketball player and the team captain for Virtus Bologna of the Lega Basket Serie A (LBA) and the EuroLeague. He was selected 18th overall in the 2007 NBA draft by the Golden State Warriors. In 2014, he won the NBA championship with the San Antonio Spurs, becoming the first Italian player to do so. He won the Three-Point Contest during the 2014 NBA All-Star Weekend. He played in the 2007, 2011, 2013, 2015, and 2017 editions of the FIBA EuroBasket and the 2006 and 2019 editions of the FIBA World Championship with the Italian national basketball team.

Professional career

Virtus and Fortitudo Bologna (2002–2007)
Belinelli played in the Italian Serie A and the EuroLeague for Virtus Bologna and Fortitudo Bologna. In 2004, he lost the EuroLeague Finals against Maccabi Tel Aviv, and in 2005, he won the Serie A title with Fortitudo.

NBA (2007–2020)

Golden State Warriors (2007–2009)
After being selected #18 in the first round of the 2007 NBA draft by the Golden State Warriors, Belinelli scored 37 points in his first NBA Summer League game against the New Orleans Hornets, going 14-on-2 from the field, including 5-on-7 from behind the arc, adding 5 boards, 2 assists and 1 steal to help the Warriors earn a 110–102 win. His performance is tied for second for the highest scoring game ever in Vegas summer league history, behind Keith Bogans' 38 scored as a member of the Orlando Magic in 2004. Belinelli finished his Summer League scoring an average of 22.8 points per game in 4 games with the Warriors, before returning to Italy to be part of the Italian national team for EuroBasket 2007. On 19 December 2008, he scored 27 points, in a game the Warriors lost to Atlanta Hawks.

Toronto Raptors (2009–2010)
On 30 July 2009, he was traded to the Toronto Raptors for Devean George, joining Italian national squad teammate Andrea Bargnani. He played his first NBA game as a starter for Toronto on 2 February 2010 against the Indiana Pacers.

New Orleans Hornets (2010–2012)
On 11 August 2010, he was traded to the New Orleans Hornets for Julian Wright. After the 2010–11 season, he became a restricted free agent. On 13 December 2011, he signed the $3.4 million qualifying offer to stay with the Hornets for one more year.

Chicago Bulls (2012-2013)
On 24 July 2012, Belinelli signed with the Chicago Bulls. Since joining the Bulls, Belinelli developed a reputation of being a clutch player, hitting shots that include a game winning shot against the Celtics in overtime while falling down, a go-ahead layup against the Detroit Pistons after Joakim Noah saved the ball from going out of bounds, a game-winning lay-up with 20 seconds remaining against the Brooklyn Nets, and a 3 pointer to give the Bulls a 1-point lead with 5 seconds remaining in a game vs. the Utah Jazz. Belinelli and Joakim Noah each scored 24 points in a game 7 victory over the Brooklyn Nets in the first round of the 2013 NBA Playoffs.

San Antonio Spurs (2013–2015)
On 11 July 2013, Belinelli signed with the San Antonio Spurs.

On 2 January 2014, Belinelli scored a career-high 32 points in a 101-105 loss to the New York Knicks.

Belinelli also won the Three-Point Contest at the 2014 NBA All-Star Weekend in New Orleans, beating Bradley Beal of the Washington Wizards at the second attempt in the final after Beal equaled Belinelli's score in the initial final round. In the tiebreaker, Belinelli made six straight shots at a single point, sweeping his fourth rack.

In his first season with the Spurs, Belinelli posted career-highs percentage-wise on field goal percentage, three-point percentage, and free-throw percentage.

In Game 3 of the 2014 NBA Finals against the two-time defending champion Miami Heat, Belinelli hit a crucial 3 pointer in the third quarter that increased San Antonio's lead back to double digits. The Heat had rallied, cutting the Spurs' half-time lead of 21 points to just seven, before Belinelli's three-pointer. Upon winning the 2014 Finals, he became the first Italian player to win an NBA championship.

Kings, Hornets, Hawks and 76ers (2015–2018)
On 13 July 2015, Belinelli signed with the Sacramento Kings. On 30 December 2015, he scored a season-high 28 points in a loss to the Philadelphia 76ers.

On 7 July 2016, Belinelli was traded to the Charlotte Hornets in exchange for the draft rights to Malachi Richardson. On 20 June 2017, Belinelli was traded, along with Miles Plumlee and the 41st pick which became Tyler Dorsey in the 2017 NBA draft, to the Atlanta Hawks in exchange for Dwight Howard and the 31st overall pick (Frank Jackson) in the 2017 NBA draft. On 9 February 2018, he was waived by the Hawks.

On 12 February 2018, Belinelli signed with the Philadelphia 76ers. In Game 3 of the Eastern Conference Semi-Finals against the Boston Celtics, Marco made a two-point corner shot to send the game to overtime, 89-89. However, the 76ers would lose to the Celtics, 98-101.

Second stint with the Spurs (2018–2020)
On 20 July 2018, Belinelli signed with the San Antonio Spurs, returning to the franchise for a second stint.

Virtus Bologna (2020–present)

On 26 November 2020, Belinelli left the NBA and returned to Italy signing a three-year deal, until June 2023 with Virtus Bologna. In April 2021, despite a winning record of 19–2, Virtus was defeated in the EuroCup's semifinals by UNICS Kazan. However, the season ended with a great success. In fact, after having knocked out 3–0 both Basket Treviso in the quarterfinals and New Basket Brindisi in the semifinals, on 11 June Virtus defeated 4–0 its historic rival Olimpia Milano in the national finals, winning its 16th national title and the first one after twenty years.

On 21 September 2021, the team won its second Supercup, defeating Olimpia Milano 90–84. Moreover, after having ousted Lietkabelis, Ulm and Valencia in the first three rounds of the playoffs, on 11 May 2022, Virtus defeated Frutti Extra Bursaspor by 80–67 at the Segafredo Arena, winning its first EuroCup and qualifying for the EuroLeague after 14 years. However, despite having ended the regular season at the first place and having ousted 3–0 both Pesaro and Tortona in the first two rounds of playoffs, Virtus was defeated 4–2 in the national finals by Olimpia Milan.

On 29 September 2022, after having ousted Milano in the semifinals, Virtus won its third Supercup, defeating 72–69 Banco di Sardegna Sassari and achieving a back-to-back, following the 2021 trophy.

National team career

Belinelli made his debut with the Italian national team in the 2006 FIBA World Championship. In that tournament, he scored 25 points against the United States national team, including a dunk on Carmelo Anthony. In that tournament, he averaged 13.5 points per game, being the best scorer of his team.

He averaged 15.5 points per game at the 2007 EuroBasket, 12.0 points per game at the 2011 EuroBasket, 13.6 points per game at the 2013 EuroBasket, 16.3 points per game at the 2015 EuroBasket and 17.9 points per game at the 2017 EuroBasket.

Career statistics

NBA

Regular season

|-
| align="left" | 
| align="left" | Golden State
| 33 || 0 || 7.3 || .387 || .390 || .778 || .4 || .5 || .2 || .0 || 2.9
|-
| align="left" | 
| align="left" | Golden State
| 42 || 23 || 21.0 || .442 || .397 || .769 || 1.7 || 2.1 || .9 || .0 || 8.9
|-
| align="left" | 
| align="left" | Toronto
| 66 || 1 || 17.0 || .406 || .380 || .835 || 1.4 || 1.3 || .6 || .1 || 7.1
|-
| align="left" | 
| align="left" | New Orleans
| 80 || 69 || 24.5 || .437 || .414 || .784 || 1.9 || 1.2 || .5 || .1 || 10.5
|-
| align="left" | 
| align="left" | New Orleans
| 66 || 55 || 29.8 || .417 || .377 || .783 || 2.6 || 1.5 || .7 || .1 || 11.8
|-
| align="left" | 
| align="left" | Chicago
| 73 || 27 || 25.8 || .395 || .357 || .839 || 1.9 || 2.0 || .6 || .1 || 9.6
|-
| style="text-align:left;background:#afe6ba;"| †
| align="left" | San Antonio
| 80 || 25 || 25.2 || .485 || .430 || .847 || 2.8 || 2.2 || .6 || .1 || 11.4
|-
| align="left" | 
| align="left" | San Antonio
| 62 || 9 || 22.4 || .423 || .374 || .848 || 2.5 || 1.5 || .5 || .0 || 9.2
|-
| align="left" | 
| align="left" | Sacramento
| 68 || 7 || 24.6 || .386 || .306 || .833 || 1.7 || 1.9 || .5 || .0 || 10.2
|-
| align="left" | 
| align="left" | Charlotte
| 74 || 0 || 24.0 || .429 || .362 || .893 || 2.4 || 2.0 || .6 || .1 || 10.5
|-
| align="left" | 
| align="left" | Atlanta
| 52 || 1 || 23.3 || .411 || .372 || .927 || 1.9 || 2.0 || .9 || .1 || 11.4
|-
| align="left" | 
| align="left" | Philadelphia
| 28 || 1 || 26.3 || .495 || .385 || .870 || 1.8 || 1.6 || .7 || .3 || 13.6
|-
| align="left" | 
| align="left" | San Antonio
| 79 || 1 || 23.0 || .413 || .372 || .903 || 2.5 || 1.7 || .4 || .1 || 10.5
|-
| align="left" | 
| align="left" | San Antonio
| 57 || 0 || 15.5 || .392 || .376 || .828 || 1.7 || 1.2 || .2 || .0 || 6.3
|- class="sortbottom"
| style="text-align:center;" colspan="2"| Career
| 860 || 219 || 22.7 || .424 || .376 || .846 || 2.1 || 1.7 || .6 || .1 || 9.7

Playoffs

|-
| align="left" | 2011
| align="left" | New Orleans
| 6 || 6 || 28.8 || .365 || .308 || 1.000 || .8 || .7 || .8 || .0 || 9.7
|-
| align="left" | 2013
| align="left" | Chicago
| 12 || 7 || 27.1 || .411 || .340 || .879 || 2.9 || 2.6 || .4 || .0 || 11.1
|-
| style="text-align:left;background:#afe6ba;"| 2014†
| align="left" | San Antonio
| 23 || 0 || 15.5 || .444 || .421 || .955 || 2.3 || .8 || .1 || .0 || 5.4
|-
| align="left" | 2015
| align="left" | San Antonio
| 7 || 0 || 16.6 || .513 || .467 || .846 || 1.9 || 1.4 || .3 || .0 || 9.3
|-
| align="left" | 2018
| align="left" | Philadelphia
| 10 || 0 || 27.3 || .406 || .348 || .871 || 2.1 || 2.0 || .7 || .0 || 12.9
|-
| style="text-align:left;" | 2019
| style="text-align:left;" | San Antonio
| 7 || 0 || 18.7 || .368 || .381 || .833 || 1.9 || 1.1 || .0 || .3 || 5.9
|- class="sortbottom"
| style="text-align:center;" colspan="2" | Career
| 65 ||13 || 21.1 || .416 || .375 || .890 || 2.1 || 1.4 || .3 || .0 || 8.5

EuroLeague

|-
| style="text-align:left;"| 2002–03
| style="text-align:left;"| Virtus Bologna
| 8 || 0 || 16.2 || .395 || .278 || .667 || 1.3 || 1.0 || .4 || .0 || 5.6 || 4.0
|-
| style="text-align:left;"| 2003–04
| style="text-align:left;"| Fortitudo Bologna
| 16 || 7 || 12.3 || .425 || .391 || .833 || .6 || .3 || .3 || .0 || 3.0 || 1.3
|-
| style="text-align:left;"| 2004–05
| style="text-align:left;"| Fortitudo Bologna
| 20 || 1 || 14.6 || .500 || .367 || .688 || 1.1 || 1.1 || .6 || .1 || 4.2 || 3.6
|-
| style="text-align:left;"| 2005–06
| style="text-align:left;"| Fortitudo Bologna
| 19 || 12 || 27.6 || .479 || .439 || .711 || 1.6 || 1.0 || 1.4 || .0 || 13.4 || 9.4
|-
| style="text-align:left;"| 2006–07
| style="text-align:left;"| Fortitudo Bologna
| 13 || 13 || 27.4 || .378 || .320 || .756 || 1.9 || 1.3 || .8 || .0 || 12.8 || 8.7
|- class="sortbottom"
| style="text-align:center;" colspan="2" | Career
| 76 || 33 || 20.0 || .439 || .379 || .727 || 1.3 || .7 || .9 || .0 || 7.9 || 5.4

See also

List of European basketball players in the United States
List of Italian NBA players
Golden State Warriors draft history
 List of youngest EuroLeague players

References

External links

Official website 
Euroleague.net Profile

1986 births
Living people
2006 FIBA World Championship players
2019 FIBA Basketball World Cup players
Atlanta Hawks players
Charlotte Hornets players
Chicago Bulls players
Fortitudo Pallacanestro Bologna players
Golden State Warriors draft picks
Golden State Warriors players
Italian expatriate basketball people in Canada
Italian expatriate basketball people in the United States
Italian men's basketball players
Lega Basket Serie A players
National Basketball Association players from Italy
New Orleans Hornets players
People from San Giovanni in Persiceto
Philadelphia 76ers players
Sacramento Kings players
San Antonio Spurs players
Shooting guards
Small forwards
Toronto Raptors players
Virtus Bologna players
Sportspeople from the Metropolitan City of Bologna